Open Mobile was a mobile network operator that offers mobile phone services exclusively in Puerto Rico. The company was established on June 12, 2007, as a relaunch of NewComm Wireless Services (formerly d/b/a Movistar). Its new owners, M/C Partners and Columbia Capital, acquired Movistar's assets for $160 million USD after Movistar filed for Chapter 11 bankruptcy protection in December 2006.

Open Mobile's business model is based on the advance payment and unlimited local call services. The company was able to achieve positive EBITDA after 5 months of its relaunch. Since 2015, the company began to offer safelink mobile re-certification procedures.

In 2014, Verizon Wireless signed a 2G and 3G roaming agreement with Open Mobile to allow Verizon customers to use Open Mobile's network without charge. This agreement came when Claro shut down the former Verizon CDMA network in Puerto Rico in favor of GSM, UMTS, and LTE.

On February 23, 2017, Sprint and Open Mobile announced an agreement to combine their businesses in Puerto Rico and the U.S. Virgin Islands into a new joint venture. Both companies will continue to operate separately until the transaction closes. The transaction close is subject to review and approval by the Federal Communications Commission, along with other regulatory authorities, which is expected to take several months.

The merger was approved in September 2017, with Sprint becoming the majority shareholder.

In the summer of 2018, all of the Open Mobile stores were changed to Boost Mobile stores.

As part of Sprint's merger with T-Mobile, Open Mobile customers will be transferred to T-Mobile. Customers who choose not to be transferred will be able to find a new carrier.

References

Companies that filed for Chapter 11 bankruptcy in 2006
Companies of Puerto Rico